The 1997 DFS Classic was a women's tennis tournament played on grass courts at the Edgbaston Priory Club in Birmingham in the United Kingdom that was part of Tier III of the 1997 WTA Tour. It was the 16th edition of the tournament and was held from 9 June until 15 June 1997. Second-seeded Nathalie Tauziat won the singles title.

Finals

Singles

 Nathalie Tauziat defeated  Yayuk Basuki 2–6, 6–2, 6–2
 It was Tauziat's 2nd title of the year and the 17th of her career.

Doubles

 Katrina Adams /  Larisa Savchenko defeated  Nathalie Tauziat /  Linda Wild 6–2, 6–3
 It was Adams' only title of the year and the 20th of her career. It was Savchenko's 1st title of the year and the 62nd of her career.

External links
 ITF tournament edition details

DFS Classic
Birmingham Classic (tennis)
DFS Classic
DFS Classic